The Giro Feminino de Ciclismo is a women's staged cycle race which takes place in Brazil and is currently rated by the UCI as 2.2.

References

Cycle racing in Brazil